Ucanal is an archaeological site of the ancient Maya civilization. It is located near the source of the Belize River in the Petén department of present-day northern Guatemala.

Location
Ucanal is located inside a bend of the Mopan River. It is accessed via the highway from Flores to Melchor de Mencos, and is near the village of Tikalito.

History
Ucanal was located in a strategic location near the source of the Belize River.

The ancient name of the Ucanal polity was K'anwitznal, and one of its first rulers was Ajaw K'uk' or Lord Quetzal. The city had strong ties with Tikal and, in the 7th century AD, with Caracol. Ucanal was attacked by the Kalomte queen-regent, Wac' Chanil Ahau or Lady Six Sky of Naranjo (Saal) in September and December of 693; and on 1 February 695 Ucanal's lord Kinich Cab ("Shield-Jaguar") was captured by the ruler of Naranjo. Kinich Cab was held at Naranjo until 22 June 712; Ucanal was reduced to the status of vassal of that city.

In 800 CE, lord Hok K'awil of Caracol captured the lord of Ucanal. Over the next decades, a Maya-speaking, Nahuat/Maya mestizo people from the Putun filled the power vacuum in Ucanal. These people did not worship the Feathered Serpent Kukulcan. In 830 CE, lord Chan Ek' Hopet installed Wat'ul Chatel as his vassal over Seibal, and commemorated it upon Stele 11 there.

One of the rulers of Ucanal was Itzamnaaj Bahlam of Ucanal.

Site
There are 114 structures in the main area and at least 150 residential groups. The protected area covers  but does not include all the minor groups. There are several temples and palaces, and two ballcourts. Many of the stelae were destroyed by invaders from Naranjo (Saal). There are 22 stelae and 16 altars.

References

Proyecto Arqueologico Ucanal

Maya sites in Petén Department
Archaeological sites in Guatemala
Former populated places in Guatemala